The Tyrades were a four-piece punk/garage band formed in Buffalo, New York.

Band members

Current members
Jenna Tyrade (Jenna Abraham) (vocals)
Jimmy Ordinary (Jim McCann) (guitar)
Robert Miscellaneous (Robert McAdams) (bass)
Frankie Jensen (drums)

Former members
Dave Unlikely (drums)

Discography

Albums
 Tyrades ( Broken Rekids, 2003)

Singles
 "On Your Video" (SmartGuy, 2005)
 "Incarcerated" (Die Slaughterhaüs, 2004)
 "I Am Homicide" (Shit Sandwich, 2004)
 "I Got a Lot" (Broken Rekids, 2002)
 "Stain on Me" (Rip Off, 2002)
 "Detonation" (Big Neck, 2001)

References

Garage punk groups
Punk rock groups from New York (state)
Musical groups from Buffalo, New York